Antón García Abril OAXS (19 May 1933 – 17 March 2021) was a Spanish composer and musician. He composed many classical orchestral works, chamber and vocal pieces, as well as over 150 scores for film and television.

Biography
Between 1974 and 2003, he was the head of the department of Compositions and Musical Forms (Composición y Formas Musicales) of the Madrid Royal Conservatory, and in 1982 he was elected a member of the Real Academia de Bellas Artes de San Fernando in Madrid. In 1994, he was awarded Spain's Premio Nacional de Música for composition, and in 2008, he was also named a member of the Real Academia de Bellas Artes de San Carlos in Valencia.

He died on 17 March 2021, at the age of 87 from COVID-19 during the COVID-19 pandemic in Spain.

Works
García Abril has composed as many orchestral works as he has chamber and vocal pieces, and he has composed music for films and television series such as El hombre y la Tierra, Fortunata y Jacinta, Anillos de oro, Segunda enseñanza, Brigada Central, Ramón y Cajal, La ciudad no es para mí and Compuesta y sin novio.

In 1966, he composed the soundtrack for the film Texas, Adios, a Spaghetti Western starring Franco Nero. Also, in 1969, he worked alongside Rafael Romero Marchent, a film director from Madrid, on the soundtrack of the movie Awkward Hands, another Spaghetti Western. He also composed the music for Amando de Ossorio's Blind Dead series of films, being Tombs of the Blind Dead (1972), Return of the Blind Dead (1973), The Ghost Galleon (1974) and Night of the Seagulls (1975).

Compositions
 1969. Twelve songs to texts by Rafael Alberti (for voice and orchestra)
 1972. Hemeroscopium (for orchestra)
 1976. Concierto aguediano (for guitar and orchestra)
 1985. Evocaciones (for solo guitar)
 1986. Concierto mudéjar (for guitar and orchestra)
 1987. Vademecum (a collection of 12 pieces for the guitar)
 1992. Divinas palabras (opera after Ramón del Valle-Inclán, premiered 1997 with Plácido Domingo)
 1994. Concierto (for piano and orchestra)
 1996. Nocturnos de la Antequeruela (for piano and orchestra)
 1999. Concierto de las tierras altas (for cello and orchestra)
 2001. Concierto de la Malvarrosa (for flute, piano and strings)
 2007. Alba de los caminos (for piano and string quintet)
 2012. Cantos de Ordesa, Concerto for viola and orchestra

Music for films and television
Between 1956 and 1994, Antón García Abril created more than 150 compositions for movies and television. He has provided soundtracks for the films:

 1962. La muerte silba un blues
 1964. La chica del trébol
 1965 La corrida (Documentary short)
 1965 Un vampiro para dos
 1965  El tímido
  1965 El cálido verano del Sr. Rodríguez
 1966. La ciudad no es para mí
 1966. Texas, Adios
 1967. Maneater of Hydra
 1967. The Cobra
 1967. Sor Citroën
 1969. Awkward Hands
 1971. The Werewolf vs. The Vampire Woman
 1972. Tombs of the Blind Dead
 1972. Dr. Jekyll y el Hombre Lobo
 1972. Pancho Villa
 1973. Curse of the Devil
 1973. Return of the Blind Dead
 1974. The Loreley's Grasp
 1974. The Ghost Galleon
 1975. A Long Return
 1975. Night of the Seagulls
 1984. Los santos inocentes
 1987. Monsignor Quixote

He also created the soundtracks of the television series:
 1974. El hombre y la Tierra
 1980. Fortunata y Jacinta
 1983. Anillos de oro
 1986. Segunda enseñanza
 1972. Los camioneros

Honours 
 Knight Grand Cross of the Civil Order of Alfonso X, the Wise (Kingdom of Spain, 16 December 2005).

References

External links
 
 
 
 

1933 births
2021 deaths
People from Teruel
Academic staff of the Madrid Royal Conservatory
Madrid Royal Conservatory alumni
Spanish classical composers
Spanish male classical composers
Spanish film score composers
Male film score composers
Recipients of the Civil Order of Alfonso X, the Wise
Deaths from the COVID-19 pandemic in Spain